Yefimovskaya is a rural locality (a village) in Vizhegodskoye Urban Settlement, Vozhegodsky District, Vologda Oblast, Russia. The population was 2 as of 2002.

Geography 
Yefimovskaya is located 8 km southwest of Vozhega (the district's administrative centre) by road. Senkinskaya is the nearest rural locality.

References 

Rural localities in Vozhegodsky District